Jupiter Community High School, also known as Jupiter High School and JHS, is a public high school in Jupiter, Florida, United States. JHS is a part of the School District of Palm Beach County and is the northernmost high school in Palm Beach County. There are over 3300 students enrolled in the school. The school's mascot is the Warrior, and the school colors are green and gold.

History

The town of Jupiter was settled in the late 19th century by settlers traveling down the Loxahatchee River. The town was incorporated in 1925, and during the 1930s a two-story school building was constructed for grades 1-12. The bottom level held the lower grades, while the high school classes were held on the upper level.

The campus now known as Jupiter High School was first built west of Military Trail in 1967 for students of the town of Jupiter. Initially the complex housed grades 7–12, with the high school on the South Campus of the school. As the town's population grew, a middle school—now Jupiter Middle School—was constructed a few miles away in 1983, and the high school encompassed the North and South Campuses.

In June 2001, groundbreaking for a new high school took place. It opened in 2003, costing over $56 million and on August 13, 2003 all students were on one campus for the first time in 20 years. The new high school is on the  that was home to the high school stadium, ball fields, tennis courts and practice fields. It is now , housing 60 classrooms and 28 laboratories, in addition to new and improved athletic facilities. The school is wired for computers in every classroom. The auditorium seats 850 and the gymnasium seats about 1,500 people. The school is facing overcrowding due to its popular state-of-the-art magnet programs and electives.

Academics
Jupiter High School is host to a wide variety of Magnet school programs, accredited by the State of Florida Department of Education. They include the Jupiter Environmental Research and Field Studies Academy, Engineering Technology Academy, Medical Academy, and the Criminal Justice Academy. In addition to magnet programs the school also offers 30 AP courses, and a wide variety of fine arts, and diverse academic electives.

Clubs and extracurricular activities
Jupiter High School is host to over 100 registered student organizations. Many of Jupiter High School's clubs have competed and won at State and National levels such as: lacrosse, rugby, softball, baseball, flag football, debate, drama, the competitive robotics team, state-ranked marching band, and the nationally ranked table tennis team. The marching band, Spirit of Jupiter won the championship title for class 3A in 2014 and 2021 and for class 4A in 2015 and 2016 at the Florida Marching Band Championships. The Winterguard won 4th place in class Elite A at the 2015 Winter Guard International championships in Dayton, Ohio. The table tennis team has won state and national acclaim from various sources.

Student Government Association
The Student Council of Jupiter Community High School has a dominant presence at the Florida Association of Student Councils, and has been recognized accordingly. The members have won more project awards in more categories than any other school in the state of Florida. For the 20112012 school year, Jupiter High has been elected President of the Palm Beach County Association of Student Councils.

Notable alumni
Andy Abad, former Major League Baseball player
Kevin Barnes, lead member of band Of Montreal
Dante Bichette, former Major League Baseball player
David O. Blanchard, atmospheric scientist and tornado expert
Matt Bosher, former National Football League punter for Atlanta Falcons
Tyler Cameron, appeared on “The Bachelorette” and former FAU football player
Todd Crannell, NFL and entertainment agent
Daryl Logullo, business executive
Miles Mikolas, MLB pitcher for the St. Louis Cardinals
Kevin O'Sullivan, University of Florida head baseball coach
Craig Page, former National Football League player for Dallas Cowboys
Cody Parkey, Cleveland Browns NFL kicker
Julia Salazar, New York State Senator for the 18th district and the first member of the Democratic Socialists of America to serve in New York's state legislature

Gallery

References

External links
 
 More school information
 Jupiter High School Robotics Team Website

High schools in Palm Beach County, Florida
Public high schools in Florida
Magnet schools in Florida
Jupiter, Florida